Mama Runs Wild is a 1937 American comedy film directed by Ralph Staub and written by Gordon Kahn and Hal Yates. The film stars Mary Boland, Ernest Truex, William "Bill" Henry, Lynne Roberts, Max Terhune and Joseph Crehan. The film was released on December 22, 1937, by Republic Pictures.

Plot
Alice Summers becomes an honorary police captain after she helps two bank robbers get caught using fingerprints they left in her purse, now she her objective is to keep criminals out of her town.

Cast
Mary Boland as Alice Summers
Ernest Truex as Ernest Summers
William "Bill" Henry as Paul Fowler
Lynne Roberts as Edith Summers 
Max Terhune as Applegate
Joseph Crehan as Tom Fowler
Dorothy Page as Mrs. Hayes
Dewey Robinson as Greengable
Julius Tannen as C. Preston Simms
Sammy McKim as Boy
John Sheehan as Snodey
James C. Morton as Adams

References

External links
 

1937 films
American comedy films
1937 comedy films
Republic Pictures films
American black-and-white films
Films directed by Ralph Staub
1930s English-language films
1930s American films